Reynaldo Curtis is a fictional character on the TV drama Law & Order, created by Ed Zuckerman and portrayed by Benjamin Bratt from 1995 to 1999. He appeared in 98 episodes (95 episodes of Law & Order and three episodes of Homicide: Life on the Street). He also appeared in Exiled: A Law & Order Movie.

Character overview
Curtis is introduced as a homicide detective in the New York Police Department, the junior partner of Lennie Briscoe (Jerry Orbach) in Manhattan's 27th Precinct Detective Squad. In contrast with his wilder predecessor, Mike Logan (Chris Noth), Curtis — a conservative, devout Catholic — does his job by the book, and views it in black and white terms: He believes that if someone breaks the law, he or she deserves to go to jail, regardless of circumstances.

Curtis transferred to the 27th from the NYPD's Organized Crime Control Bureau, and occasionally comments on the increased scope of investigations he was able to undertake due to its larger budget. He left the OCCB because his female supervisor was making unwelcome sexual advances toward him.

Curtis and his wife Deborah (played by Pat Moya) were married in 1989 and had three daughters: Olivia (born 1990), Serena (born 1992) and Isabel (born 1994). His sister died in a car accident at the age of 10. He is of Peruvian, English, Native American and German descent. His wife Deborah is part-Native American, of Pequot ancestry; it is implied that this gives her a source of income which relieves Curtis of the need to work extra jobs.

Both women and men are attracted to Curtis.  On two occasions, women attempt to seduce Curtis, spend the night with him (without any sexual contact), and complicate the case against the defendant when the alleged relationship is used to challenge Curtis's testimony.

In the character's first season on the show, he is rebuked by his superiors on at least four occasions: in the first, Briscoe calls him out for pulling his gun on a suspect; in the second, Curtis loses his temper with a suspect in the interrogation room and must be removed; in the third, Lieutenant Anita Van Buren (S. Epatha Merkerson) reprimands him for allowing a father to physically discipline his son in the interrogation room; in the fourth, Van Buren orders him to take the day off after rough conduct at headquarters.

After about a year on the job, Curtis' values are tested by a series of personal problems. Distraught after witnessing the execution of a man he helped prosecute, Curtis cheats on Deborah with a college student (Jennifer Garner). His infidelity nearly destroys their marriage, but they repair their relationship after going through counseling. Just as their lives are returning to normal, however, Deborah is diagnosed with multiple sclerosis. Curtis feels responsible for her suffering, as if God is punishing her for his sins. At this time, he also becomes more flexible in his approach to work, and he forms a deeper bond with the thrice-divorced Briscoe, who offers him advice and someone to lean on. Curtis returns the favor when Briscoe's daughter is murdered by briefly letting him stay with his family to help him deal with the grief. They become so close that Curtis' daughters call Briscoe "Uncle Lenny".
By 1999, Deborah's MS has worsened considerably, to the point that she can hardly hold a toothbrush on her own. Curtis takes early retirement to care for her, and is succeeded by Det. Ed Green (Jesse L. Martin).

He returns for a brief guest appearance on the December 11, 2009 episode, "Fed," 10 years after his departure from the precinct.  The episode reveals that the Curtis family had moved to California some years before.  At the time of the episode, Deborah had finally succumbed to MS, and he and his daughters have returned to bury her on Long Island, where she and her family are from.  Curtis tells Van Buren that Deborah died at home in his arms, and also that he had called and spoken to Briscoe shortly before his death.

Personality
Curtis is both politically and socially conservative: He is a staunch supporter of the death penalty and drug prohibition, and disapproves of single-parent families and in vitro fertilization. (Despite his conservatism, however, he claimed to be a supporter of Bill Clinton.) His unwavering, moralistic work ethic initially causes friction with Briscoe.

Curtis especially disapproves of affirmative action. Curtis, who is of mestizo origin (Peruvian on his mother's side) feels he has made it on his own merits and resents what he sees as the suggestion that minorities need an added advantage. He is a supporter of former New York Governor George Pataki.

The character introduces a marked step up in the use of technology as an aid to solving crimes.  He is the first detective in the series to carry  a mobile phone and use a laptop computer. Curtis is considerably more computer-literate than Briscoe; his familiarity with the Internet is the linchpin in solving several cases.  He is also the first detective character featured in the Law & Order universe to carry a semi-automatic pistol instead of a revolver.  Curtis's duty weapon is a Glock 19.

While sifting through compact discs at an outdoor store at the end of season six, Curtis mentions that he likes the bands Oasis and Big Brother and the Holding Company.

Homicide: Life on the Street appearances
Curtis appears along with Briscoe on the Homicide: Life on the Street episodes "For God and Country", "Baby, It's You" and "Sideshow", in which they team up with John Munch (Richard Belzer) on cases that span from New York to Baltimore.

References

Law & Order characters
Fictional New York City Police Department detectives
Television characters introduced in 1995
Fictional Hispanic and Latino American people
Crossover characters in television
American male characters in television